Johorea is a monotypic genus of Southeast Asian dwarf spiders containing the single species, Johorea decorata. It was first described by G. H. Locket in 1982, and has only been found in Malaysia.

See also
 List of Linyphiidae species (I–P)

References

Linyphiidae
Monotypic Araneomorphae genera
Spiders of Asia